The Haiti Air Corps was the air force of Haiti from 1942 to 1994. The air corps was disbanded along with the rest of the armed forces after Operation Uphold Democracy, the US invasion of 1994.

History 
The Haitian Air Corps was founded in 1942 with aircraft supplied by the US. The main task for this new air force was transport and communication. The Haitian Air Corps was headquartered at Bowen Field which was a former US marine corps airfield. Môle-Saint-Nicolas Airport was a secondart airfield. During World War 2 the Haitian Air Corps was engaged in the Caribbean anti submarine warfare campaign against the German Navy. In 1950 the Haitian Air Corps received its first combat aircraft: six F-51D Mustangs which were active during the Duvalier period. In October 1970 the mustangs were replaced by T-28 Trojans from France. The T-28s were then replaced by O-2As in 1975. In the 1980s the Haitian Air Corps received its first jet aircraft: the SIAI-Machetti S-211 and these were accompanied by SF-260s to replace the O-2s which were sold for parts. In 1990 the SIAI-Machetti S-211s were sold, 2 were sold to United States private companies and the other two were sold to the Singapore Air Force. During operation Uphold Democracy the Haitian Air Corps played almost no role in Haitian defence, the Haitian inventory at the time included: Two O-57 Grasshopper scout planes, Three BT-13 Valiant trainer planes, One C-78 Bobcat transport plane, and one C-46 Commando transport plane. Almost all of the inventory at the time of the invasion dated back to World War Two and was in very poor condition at the time, the air corps was disband along with the rest of the armed forces in 1994.

Inventory 

At the time of the disbandment of the Haitian Air Corps this was the inventory:

Aircraft retired before the disbandment of the Haitian Air Corps: North American Aviation F-51D Mustang, North American Aviation T-28 Trojan, Cessna O-2A Skymaster, Sikorsky S-55, de Havilland Mosquito, de Havilland Canada DHC-2 Beaver/de Havilland Canada DHC-6 Twin Otter, Hughes Helicopters 269C, Hughes Helicopters 369C, Sikorsky S-58T, Aermacchi SF.260TP, Douglas C-47 Dakota, SIAI-Machetti S-211.

See also 

 Armed Forces of Haiti

References 

Air forces by country
Aviation in Haiti
Military of Haiti